Camille de Faucompret (born 12 December 1985 in Pau, Pyrénées-Atlantiques) is a French snowboarder. She placed 11th in the women's parallel giant slalom event at the 2010 Winter Olympics.

References

1985 births
Living people
French female snowboarders
Olympic snowboarders of France
Snowboarders at the 2010 Winter Olympics